The Big Broadcast is a 1932 American pre-Code musical comedy film directed by Frank Tuttle and starring Bing Crosby, Stuart Erwin, and Leila Hyams. Based on the play Wild Waves by William Ford Manley, the film is about a radio-singer who becomes a popular hit with audiences, but takes a disrespectful approach to his career. His repeated latenesses leads to the bankruptcy of the radio station, but his career is saved by a new friend who buys the station and gives him his job back.

The film co-stars George Burns and Gracie Allen in supporting roles. The Big Broadcast was produced by Paramount Pictures and was the first in a series of four Big Broadcast movies.

Plot
Radio-singer Bing Hornsby (Bing Crosby) is not very serious about his career. His chronic tardiness and his soon-to-be marriage with the notorious Mona Lowe (Sharon Lynn) has become an issue at station WADX.

After an unpleasant conversation with station manager George Burns, concerning dismissal and a lawsuit, the despondent singer visits a speakeasy. While there, Hornsby sees miserable Texas oilman Leslie McWhinney (Stuart Erwin), who does not recognize Bing Hornsby as a celebrity. Hornsby consoles Leslie, who expresses his heartbreak over a woman swindling him out of $100,000. Hornsby initially intends to comfort him, but he soon sees a newspaper article about Mona's betrayal. They both realize they have been wronged by their relationships.

That night, Hornsby invites Leslie to his apartment, where the electricity goes out. They are both drunk, and Hornsby convinces Leslie to join him in suicide via gas poisoning. Leslie reluctantly goes along with the plan, sitting side by side in the kitchen. As they near death, they are haunted by a ghostly apparition of a skull and an accordion player who sings "Here Lies Love" (Arthur Tracy).

Before they die, they are rescued by a doorman and Anita Rogers (Leila Hyams), secretary at station WADX and the former fiancée of Leslie.

The next morning, Hornsby and Leslie wake up to find they are still alive. Anita admits to Leslie that she has fallen in love with Hornsby. Hornsby then invites Leslie to join them at WADX, saying he can find him a job around the radio station.

Meanwhile, station manager George Burns is riddled by the addled conversation and hijinks of his stenographer, Gracie Allen. After multiple mishaps, he loses the radio station and repo men begin to take out the furniture. A confused Leslie, looking for a job around the station, helps the repo men carry out a desk before realizing the station is going out of business.

Leslie reveals that he still has $900,000 and uses this money to buy the radio station, in order to help out Hornsby and Anita, whom he still loves. Leslie comes up with the idea of putting on a "big broadcast" of stars to pull the station out of debt.

Mona returns on the scene and reinstates the wedding, which makes Hornsby quickly forget about his budding romance with Anita. Hornsby goes out with Mona hours before the big broadcast, threatening to ruin the show as he is the best-for-last performer.

Leslie expresses that he is unconditionally supportive of Hornsby and Anita's relationship, which makes Anita cry. She admits to Leslie that she loves Hornsby because he reminds her of Leslie, particularly his voice. She asks Leslie for a kiss, and despite his confusion he obliges.

Leslie then visits Mona's apartment hours after the show has started, only to find that Hornsby is lying on the sofa, apparently drunk. In actuality, Hornsby winks at Mona to indicate he is pretending to be intoxicated in order to skip the show and spend more time with her. Leslie continues to urge him to perform, while Mona seems to be incredibly furious at Hornsby's irresponsibility. Leslie leaves after reminding Hornsby that he is disappointing Anita. After he is gone, Mona demands to know who Anita is; when Hornsby refuses to tell her, she throws a vase and shatters it against the wall by Hornsby's head. Hornsby is shown turning around furiously and pulling up his sleeves.

While walking back to the station, Leslie overhears an older couple listening to a record of Hornsby singing "Please" in their first-floor apartment window. Leslie then gets the idea to find a record and spin it on the air, hopeful that people would assume it to be a live performance. The husband in the apartment window rises out of his seat and tosses the record out the window, where it shatters against the sidewalk. Desperately, Leslie attempts to find a record of the song and gets into various comedic situations, usually ending with an ironic twist that leads to the next situation. Situations include finding a record store, only for it to be closed; finding the record store owner's apartment and enticing him downstairs, only to accidentally knock over the display, spilling records all over the floor; attempting to throw a pineapple at the glass to rob the store, only to hit a policeman instead; falling over a child's toy and landing on the record; knocking over a woman's grocery bag; accidentally trading her the record for a slab of meat; nearly having a person step on the record; and lastly, melting the record right before his ascent to the radio station.

In a rush, Leslie asks for the curtains to be closed. He then plays the record on the air; however, as it is melted, it produces a humorously bad effect. The band begins to play "Please" and there is apparently no singer, as Hornsby continues to be absent. Seeing no other option, an anxious Leslie bursts into song, accompanying the band with vocals that are evidently untrained. He stumbles over the lyrics and cannot produce the correct whistling tones.

Anita, listening to the broadcast, looks shocked as she recognizes Leslie's voice instead of Bing's. From her facial expression, it can be assumed that she finds Leslie brave and endearing and returns to her romance with Leslie.

Just in time for the second verse, Hornsby returns and performs the song, improvising alternate lyrics as a message to Anita to take Leslie back as her fiancé. Hornsby, who actually has been feigning irresponsibility to bring Leslie and Anita together, succeeds in reuniting the former lovers. Mona is listening to him in the booth; she pouts and has a black eye as she listens to him sing, looking with admiration and fear upon him. The black eye insinuates that Hornsby had assaulted her earlier in the evening as punishment for leaving him and for her asking about Anita.

Cast

 Bing Crosby as Bing Hornsby
 Stuart Erwin as Leslie McWhinney
 Leila Hyams as Anita Rogers
 Sharon Lynn as Mona
 George Burns as himself
 Gracie Allen as herself
 George Barbier as Clapsaddle
 Ralph Robertson as Announcer
 Alex Melesh as Animal Man
 Spec O'Donnell as Office Boy
 Anna Chandler as Mrs. Cohen

 Thomas Carrigan as Officer
 The Mills Brothers as Themselves
 Irving Bacon as Prisoner
 The Boswell Sisters as Themselves
 Cab Calloway as himself
 Leonid Kinskey as Ivan
 Eddie Lang as himself
 Vincent Lopez & His Orchestra as Themselves
 Dewey Robinson as Basso
 Kate Smith as herself
 Arthur Tracy as himself

Production

Filming locations
 Hollywood, Los Angeles, California, USA (main scenes)
 Paramount Studios, Astoria, Queens, New York City, New York, USA

Soundtrack
Introductory sequence (signature tunes): "Where the Blue of the Night" (sung by Bing Crosby]; "When the Moon Comes over the Mountain" (sung by Kate Smith); "Shout, Sister, Shout" (sung by The Boswell Sisters); "Minnie the Moocher" (sung by Cab Calloway); "Goodbye Blues" (sung by The Mills Brothers).
"I Surrender Dear" (snatch only - sung by Bing Crosby)
"Dinah" (sung by Bing Crosby)
"Here Lies Love" (sung by Arthur Tracy, and again by Bing Crosby)
"I've Got Five Dollars" (snatch only - sung by Bing Crosby)
"Please" (sung by Bing Crosby)
"Tiger Rag" (sung by The Mills Brothers)
"Drummer Man" (Vincent Lopez and His Orchestra)
"Trees" (sung by Donald Novis)
"Crazy People" (Sung by The Boswell Sisters)
"It Was So Beautiful" (sung by Kate Smith)
"Kicking the Gong Around" (sung by Cab Calloway)

Crosby recorded the songs for Brunswick Records and "Dinah" and "Please" both topped the charts of the day.

American Film Institute recognition
 2004: AFI's 100 Years...100 Songs:	
 "Where the Blue of the Night Meets the Gold of the Day" – Nominated

Following films in series
 The Big Broadcast of 1936
 The Big Broadcast of 1937
 The Big Broadcast of 1938

Reception
It was Bing Crosby's first starring role in a full-length film and generally he got good reviews. "The film is a credit to Crosby as a screen juve possibility, although he has a decidedly dizzy and uncertain role which makes him behave as no human being does." The New York American commented: "Bing Crosby is the star, make no mistake about it. The “Blue of the Night” boy is a picture personality, as he demonstrated in his two-reelers. He has a camera face and a camera presence. Always at ease, he troupes like a veteran." The Hollywood Citizen News had more to say: ".... Bing Crosby croons several attractive songs which seem destined to enjoy wide popularity. For that matter, he needn’t be ashamed of his acting either. Burns and Allen have several good comedy sequences, and Cab Calloway and his orchestra are excellent in one sequence. All the radio stars are heard much as you hear them on the air. The novelty of seeing them may be an attraction. But Tuttle has not relied upon the drawing power of that novelty. He has injected little touches of fantasy, hints of satire, moments of slapstick comedy and a general impression of jolly good humor. He tells you frankly that this picture is not to be taken seriously and I think that most audiences will believe him and thereby enjoy it."

References

External links
 
 
 

1932 films
1932 musical comedy films
American black-and-white films
Paramount Pictures films
1930s English-language films
Films directed by Frank Tuttle
American musical comedy films
1930s American films